KTDE 100.5 MHz FM is a radio station licensed to Gualala, California.  The station broadcasts a Classic rock format and is owned by The Tide Community Broadcasting, Inc.

The station carries the Commonwealth Club weekly broadcast.

In the media
In a December 1983 episode of Magnum, P.I. titled "The Look", the 102.7 MHz frequency was used as the home of the fictitious KTDE, "K-Tide". The plot revolved around a female disc jockey at that radio station. In reality, the 102.7 MHz frequency was dark at that time, as were all FM frequencies above 97.5 MHz (KPOI, now KHCM-FM) on Oahu in Hawaii.

References

External links
KTDE's official website

TDE
Classic rock radio stations in the United States